University of the Ozarks (U of O) is a private university in Clarksville, Arkansas. Enrollment averages around 900 students, representing 25 countries. U of O is affiliated with the Presbyterian Church (U.S.A.).

History
University of the Ozarks traces its roots back to 1834, making it the oldest university in Arkansas and one of the oldest institutions of higher education west of the Mississippi River. It was founded by Cumberland Presbyterians in 1834 as Cane Hill School in Cane Hill, Arkansas in Washington County, later becoming Cane Hill College. Its successor, Arkansas Cumberland College, opened in Clarksville in September 1891. The name was changed to College of the Ozarks in 1920. The university alma mater was written in 1928 by Rev. John W. Laird, pastor of the Presbyterian Church of Rochester, New York.

In 1875, the university became the first institution of higher education in Arkansas to admit women.
In 1946, the university housed the state's first pharmacy school.

During the years of World War II, the enrollment decreased to the point that the Board of Trustees decided to find a tenant for the facilities. From January 1944 through May 1945, the United States Navy leased the full campus for operating a Primary School in their Electronics Training Program. An estimated total of 3,000 Navy and Marine servicemen were trained in the three-month course. In this period, classes for the 150 College of the Ozarks students were held off-campus at the First Presbyterian Church; female students were mainly housed in the church's adjoining Manse.

In 1957, the university became the first predominately white university in Arkansas to integrate, and in 1959 the first to graduate an African-American, more than 7 years before any others. In 1963 Ozarks athlete Sylvester Benson became the first African-American to compete in the Arkansas Intercollegiate Conference.

In 1987, the name was changed to University of the Ozarks. The university enrollment has increased significantly since the mid-1990s, and the number of full-time faculty has been increased from 32 to 48. During the past decade, the university's supporters helped increase the school's endowment by 284 percent, contributing more than $100 million for academic programs, scholarships, faculty and staff benefits, and facilities.

In 1998, U of O received the largest single monetary donation ever made to a private university in Arkansas - $39.5 million from the Walton Family Charitable Support Foundation.

Campus 
University of the Ozarks' 30-acre campus, sits at the top of College Hill on the north edge of Clarksville, Arkansas, a town with a population of about 10,000 in the Arkansas River Valley.

The campus has a long history at its current location, dating back to 1891. In the years since the first cornerstone was laid on the site, the campus has undergone continued growth and improvement. There are now more than 20 buildings on campus, with the ten major buildings arranged around a central mall which features a picturesque fountain. The large trees and the classically styled buildings combine to give the campus a distinctive look.

Boreham Business Building
The Boreham Business Building was built in 1996.

Harvey and Bernice Jones Learning Center
The Harvey and Bernice Jones Learning Center was originally built in 1988.

Mabee Administration Building
The Mabee Administration Building was built in 1963. It was originally known the Dobson Library prior to 1996.

Mabee Gymnasium
The Mabee Gymnasium was originally built in 1958 and was extended in 1972.

Munger-Wilson Memorial Chapel 
One of the main landmarks of the university is the Raymond Munger Memorial Chapel, erected in 1933. The chapel was built with one of the single largest donations ever received by the college at the time, a $75,000 gift from Miss Jesse Munger of Plainfield, N.J. Munger donated the money to build the chapel in memory of her father, Raymond Munger, a New York businessman who was known for his interest in religion and education. College students were paid to provide much of the labor for excavation, laying of the foundation and hauling of materials. Munger Chapel, which is listed in the National Register of Historic Places, was designed by architect A.O. Clark of Rogers, Ark. Built of limestone trimmed with Nu-Carth stone, it is of Gothic design and follows general plans used in large cathedrals. The stained glass windows were designed and installed by The Willet Studios of Philadelphia. The university holds weekly services for the campus community in the chapel. It is also a popular wedding venue. The university celebrated the 75th anniversary of the chapel during a special ceremony during the 2008 Alumni Weekend.

In 2014, the Raymond Munger Memorial Chapel at University of the Ozarks received a $2 million gift from Frances E. Wilson of Tulsa, Oklahoma, for a variety of renovations and improvements that would proceed until December 2015. The university's board of trustees formally accepted the gift at its Spring Board Meeting on April 26, 2014. Wilson made the gift to the university in memory of her late husband, Thomas D. Wilson.  In accepting the gift, the board unanimously voted to express its appreciation to Wilson by renaming the building Munger-Wilson Memorial Chapel. The sanctuary and exterior of the Chapel underwent a great deal of restoration and replacement of structural elements to preserve the historic look and spiritual feel of what is an iconic landmark in this area.

Robson Library
The Robson Library, named after Leland & Hazel Robson, was built in 1996 as a replacement for the Dobson Library, now known as the Mabee Administration Building.

Seay Student Center
The Seay Student Center was built in 1966 and was renovated in 1996, 2011, and 2021.

Walker Hall 
Walker Hall was completed in 2002, funded by a gift from the Willard and Pat Walker Charitable Foundation of Springdale. With its massive 24-foot limestone columns, red granite steps and majestic wood doors, Walker Hall closely resembles its predecessor, Hurie Hall, which occupied the same area of the campus for almost 80 years. In continued honor of Dr. Hurie's contributions to the university, the new facility is home to the Wiley Lin Hurie Education Center, located on its third level. The center contains faculty and staff offices, tutoring rooms, document storage areas, and "smart classrooms" which will give Ozarks education students the chance to learn teaching skills in a modern, flexible environment. The first floor of the 36,000-square-foot facility houses the university's communication program, which now boasts some of the most modern and sophisticated television, radio, and multi-media equipment to be found in the entire region. The main entrance, located on the second level, opens into a large lobby area complete with a lounge area, large screen TV, and a view of the magnificent spiral staircase, all in a flood of natural light coming through the large central skylight. The second floor also houses the Robert H. Basham Micro-Teaching Lab, named in honor of long-time University professor, Dr. Robert Basham.

Walton Fine Arts Center 
The Walton Fine Arts Building, named for Mr. Sam Walton and his wife, Helen R. Walton, was completed in 1987. The building houses the Division of Humanities and Fine Arts, and features the 700-seat Seay Theatre, the 150-seat Rowntree Recital Hall, the Stephens Art Gallery, a black box theatre, a television studio, an art studio, classrooms and a computer lab.

Wilson Science Center
The Thomas and Frances Wilson Science Center was built in 1969. It originally known as the T. L. Smith Science Center. In 1996, the building was extended and renamed the Smith-Broyles Science Center. In 2021, the building underwent a major renovation 
and was renamed the Thomas and Frances Wilson Science Center.

Organization and administration
Wiley Lin Hurie served as president of the university during its early days in Clarksville. Hurie led a number of important initiatives during his tenure as president, including the drive to join the North Central Association of Colleges and universities. During the presidency of Wiley Lin Hurie (1923–1949), Ozarks gained a favorable impression throughout the region for its relatively low tuition and fees, and it allayed local concerns about the risks of co-education by enforcing a strict code of moral conduct and discipline.

Under the stewardship of Rick Niece, who began serving in 1997, funding helped propel Ozarks into the twenty-first century with multiple new faculty positions; several new buildings (including the $7 million Walker Hall, completed in 2002); and a stronger system of student recruitment, retention, and support. Niece, who was named the university's 24th president in 1997, stepped down on June 30, 2013, after 16 years of dedicated service and leadership at the helm of the Clarksville, Ark., campus. Only the presidencies of F.R. Earle (1858-1891) and Wiley Lin Hurie (1923-1949) lasted longer in the university's 182-year history.

The University of the Ozarks Board of Trustees elected Richard L. "Rich" Dunsworth, J.D., as the university's 25th president, which was effective July 1, 2013.

Academics 
University of the Ozarks offers more than 60 programs of study, along with several pre-professional sequences. The curriculum is based on a liberal arts approach, while also offering strong professional preparation in a number of areas. Students have access to a variety of academic support resources, including the university's Student Success Center.

The university offers students individualized attention and academic advising, with an average class size of 17, and a student/faculty ratio of 15:1.

Jones Learning Center 
The university is also home to the Jones Learning Center, the first program in the country designed specifically to help students with learning disabilities at the college level. For an additional fee, students enrolled in the JLC receive a number of enhanced services designed to help them succeed in their college studies.

Enrollment
Based on Fall 2018 Fact Sheet
Students: 872
Female: 441 (52%)
Male: 431 (48%)
Countries Represented: 25
Student to Faculty Ratio: 15 to 1
25/75 Percentile ACT Composite Scores: 20/27
Average Freshman HS GPA: 3.30

Student life

Athletics 
The University of the Ozarks Eagles are a member of the NCAA Division III and compete in the American Southwest Conference against schools from the states of Louisiana, Mississippi, and Texas. The university offers competition in baseball, men's and women's basketball, men's and women's cross country, men's and women's soccer, softball, and men's and women's tennis. In 2014, cheer & STUNT, wrestling, and men's and women's indoor and outdoor track were added. In 2016, the university added men's and women's swimming.

The Eagles competed in the Arkansas Intercollegiate Conference of the National Association of Intercollegiate Athletics (NAIA) from 1947 to 1995.

References

External links 
Official website
Official athletics website

 
1834 establishments in Arkansas Territory
Buildings and structures in Johnson County, Arkansas
Education in Johnson County, Arkansas
Educational institutions established in 1834
Ozarks
Universities and colleges affiliated with the Presbyterian Church (USA)
University of the Ozarks
Liberal arts colleges in Arkansas